Nigar Usubova (May 2, 1914 – September 15, 1995) was a teacher, professor and head of piano department of Baku Academy of Music. She also worked as a vice-rector for educational and scientific work of Baku Academy of Music. She was twice awarded the Order of the Badge of Honor.

Life 
Nigar Usubova was born in 1914 in Salahli village of Qazakh District to Ibrahim bey Usubov (major-general of Imperial Russian Army and Azerbaijan Democratic Republic) and Govhar Khanum (daughter of Mirza Huseyn Afandi Qayibov, the mufti of Transcaucasus). She graduated from the Azerbaijan State Industrial Institute in 1935 and the Azerbaijan State Conservatory in 1947.

From 1952 to 1970 he was an associate professor of the piano department of the conservatory, vice-rector for educational and scientific work. In 1966 she became a professor. From 1959 to 1969 she worked as the head of the piano department of Baku Academy of Music. She was a follower of Alexander Goldenweiser and studied the music of Anton Arensky, dedicating a methodological research work to him.

Awards 
She was twice awarded the Order of the Badge of Honor. He was an Honored Art Worker of the Republic of Azerbaijan.

References

1914 births
1995 deaths
Academic staff of the Baku Academy of Music
Soviet Azerbaijani people
Baku Academy of Music alumni
20th-century classical musicians
20th-century Azerbaijani women